Leopard 6 Litre Roadster is a classical sport-style luxury car designed by entrepreneur Zbysław Szwaj. The car is produced by a privately held Polish company Leopard Automobile Mielec Sp. z o.o. Zbysław Szwaj is the company co-founder, designer, and also the designer of the Gepard car.

Construction 
First historical design sketches of this sports car were made at V. Vemmerlöv in Sweden. The new Leopard 6 Liter's Roadster, with the exception of the GM LS2 All-aluminum V8 engine (also powering the Chevrolet Corvette), is completely hand crafted at a state of the art, small production facility at Mielec, Republic of Poland. The current production capacity at the new factory is limited to only 25 units per year to guarantee a high level of precision in the custom production process.

Technical data

The body was handcrafted of aluminium with a tubular space frame chassis.
The engine was an aluminium V8 5967 ccm developing  at 6000 rpm, and 542 Nm at 4400 rpm.
It had a 6-speed manual gearbox.
The brakes were Brembo 4-pistons.

Launch 
Although the design of the newest version of vehicle started about 1995, the first car was completed about November 2003. The Leopard 6 Liters Roadster was officially launched about April 2005 in Paris, France, first units to hit the market were produced about late 2005, now selling for about €130,000.
Leopard is claiming the title of the most expensive ever commercially produced Polish vehicle. The total number of manufactured units currently stands about 25 and is to be limited to maximum of 200 to retain the exclusive status.
The manufacturer is preparing  a new, stronger, Leopard Coupe model.

References

External links 
 Manufacturer's official site pl / en
 Manufacturers site pl /en
 Leopard Automobile - Mielec Sp. z o.o.
 Swedish sponsor's site

Pictures gallery 
 pictures gallery
 Leopard
 Roadster Coupe

 Pictures gallery
 Leopard Automobile logo
 front
 rear right side view
 rear left side view
 frame
 cockpit rear view
 cockpit right side view
 Zbysław Szwaj and his dream Leopard
 Specs
 Manufacturing quarters

Roadsters
Luxury vehicles
Cars of Poland